Charles Adam Keeton IV  (born June 15, 1993) is an American football coach and former quarterback. He played college football for the Utah State Aggies.

College career
As a true freshman in 2011, Keeton started eight of nine games, completing 106 of 174 passes for 1,200 yards with 11 touchdowns and two interceptions. In 2012, he started all 13 games, completing 275 of 407 passes for 3,373 yards 27 touchdowns and nine interceptions. He was a first team All-WAC selection. From 2013 to 2015, his career was plagued by injuries. He played in only six games in 2013, three in 2014, and seven in 2015.

Professional career
Keeton went undrafted in the 2016 NFL Draft. He was invited to a rookie minicamp by the Houston Texans.

References

External links
Utah State Aggies bio 

1993 births
Living people
Sportspeople from Houston
Players of American football from Houston
American football quarterbacks
Utah State Aggies football players
Coaches of American football from Texas
Oregon State Beavers football coaches
Utah State Aggies football coaches
Texas Tech Red Raiders football coaches